Fuumu is a member of the Teke languages dialect continuum of the Congolese plateau. The two dialects, Fuumu (Ifuumu) and Wuumu (Iwuumu), are sometimes considered separate languages. They are sometimes considered part of South Teke.

References

Teke languages